Midelfart is a surname. Notable people with the surname include:

Celina Midelfart (born 1973), Norwegian businesswoman
Hans Christian Ulrik Midelfart (1772–1823), Norwegian Lutheran minister and politician
Tove Kvammen Midelfart (born 1951), Norwegian lawyer and businesswoman

See also
Midelfart family